Christopher Barnett is a British supervising sound editor, re-recording mixer and music Mixer at  Skywalker Sound.

Filmography
 The Little Prince (2016) - Supervising Sound Editor
 Racing Dreams (2009) - Supervising Sound Editor

Session discography

Awards
 Winner, 2014 Motion Picture Sound Editors Golden Reel Award for the movie Dirty Wars

References

External links

Year of birth missing (living people)
Living people
American audio engineers
British sound editors